AYZ may be a code for:
Atlant-Soyuz Airlines
Zahn's Airport

ayz is the ISO 630 code for the Maybrat language